Anjalai Ammal Mahalingam Engineering College (AAMEC) is a college in Kovilvenni near Needamangalam, Thiruvarur, Tamil Nadu, India. Established in 1995, it offers higher education in engineering and management.

Anjalai Ammal Mahalingam Engineering College was affiliated with Anna University Trichy. The college was approved by All India Council for Technical Education (AICTE).

AAMEC is on NH83. It has a railway station at the back entrance of college.

Academics
AAMEC offers six undergraduate and two postgraduate courses.

Undergraduate courses
Chemical Engineering
Computer Science and Engineering
Electronics and Communication Engineering
Electrical and Electronics Engineering
Information Technology
Mechanical Engineering
Civil Engineering

Postgraduate courses
Master of Computer Application

References 

http://aamec.edu.in

Engineering colleges in Tamil Nadu
Colleges affiliated to Anna University
Education in Thanjavur district
Educational institutions established in 1995
1995 establishments in Tamil Nadu